Anaerobutyricum hallii (formerly Eubacterium hallii) is an anaerobic bacterium that lives inside the human digestive system.

References

Anaerobes
Bacteria described in 2018